William or Bill Edgar may refer to:
William Edgar (politician) (1858–1948), Australian politician
Bill Edgar (American football) (1898–1970), American football player
William Edgar (engineer) (born 1938), British mechanical engineer
William Edgar (apologist) (born 1944), American Christian apologist